The 1978 San Jose State Spartans football team represented San Jose State University during the 1978 NCAA Division I-A football season as a member of the Pacific Coast Athletic Association. The team was led by third year head coach Lynn Stiles. They played home games at Spartan Stadium in San Jose, California. The Spartans finished the season as champions of the PCAA for the third time in four years, with a record of seven wins and five losses (7–5, 4–1 PCAA).

Schedule

Team players in the NFL
The following were selected in the 1979 NFL Draft.

The following finished their San Jose State career in 1978, were not drafted, but played in the NFL.

Notes

References

San Jose State
San Jose State Spartans football seasons
Big West Conference football champion seasons
San Jose State Spartans football